This is an incomplete list of men's Australian rules football leagues in Australia.

There is also a Victorian only list of former Associations and Leagues too. In the early 1900's a lot of club's would move from one association to another and other football association's would be formed amongst near by small rural clubs and towns.

There are active leagues in all states and territories for senior players.

For Women's Australian rules football see List of Australian rules football leagues in Australia 
See Also List of Australian rules football leagues outside Australia''

For Rec Footy''' (social non-contact) competitions, see Rec Footy#List of AFL Rec Footy Competitions.

Senior Football Leagues

Current

Former Football Associations / Leagues

Victoria

Australia wide

See also

List of women's Australian rules football leagues
Countries playing Australian rules football

References

Leagues in Australia